Plutus is the Greek god of wealth. It may also refer to:

Arts, entertainment, and media
 Plutus (opera), a three-act opéra comique by Charles Lecocq
 Plutus (play), an Ancient Greek comedy by the playwright Aristophanes

Other uses
 Karl Plutus (1904–2010), Estonian jurist
 Chrysoritis plutus, a butterfly of the family Lycaenidae found only in South Africa
 Huanghai Plutus, a 2007–present Chinese mid-size pickup truck

See also
 Pluteus (disambiguation)